Barwick-in-Elmet (pronounced Barrick-in-Elmet) is a village in West Yorkshire,  east of Leeds city centre. It is one of only three places in the area to be explicitly associated with the ancient Romano-British kingdom of Elmet, the others being Scholes-in-Elmet and Sherburn-in-Elmet.

The village is part of the civil parish of Barwick in Elmet and Scholes and sits in the Harewood ward of Leeds City Council.

Etymology
The name Barwick comes from the Old English words bere ('barley') and wīc ('settlement, specialised farm'), thus meaning 'a barley farm' or 'an outlying grange or part on an estate reserved for the lord's use, producing barley'. The name is first attested in the Domesday Book of 1086 as Bereuuith and Bereuuit. The appellation 'in Elmet' serves to distinguish the settlement from the various others of the same name. The first attested appellation of this kind for Barwick-in-Elmet is in fact the Latin Berewyke juxta Abberford ('Barwick-by-Aberford') from 1301. The combination Berewyke in Elmet is first attested in 1329.

History

Earthworks, including a mound and ditch, comprise part of a large Iron Age fort centred on Wendel Hill, near the village. The site was used later for a Norman motte-and-bailey castle and a Second World War observation post. The land is currently under joint ownership, held as a trust (formed in 1996) for the benefit of the community.

An ancient British kingdom named Elmet (Welsh Elfed) included the area. Some scholars  believe that the capital of the kingdom was at or close to Barwick.

There is reference to an agricultural settlement in the Domesday Book of 1086. From a taxation survey, it is known that in 1379 there were 197 adults living in about 100 households.

It is believed that William of Orange spent some time in this area leaving behind claims to his offspring, There are still settlers in the village to this day bearing the associated relevant names "Orange and Wilson (Wills son)"

For some time the Manor of Barwick and Scholes was in the ownership of the Gascoigne family of Parlington and Lotherton.

In 1720, the first known school in Barwick in Elmet opened. Morwick Hall was built in the mid to late 18th century for Edward Gray, who was Lord Mayor of Leeds in 1749 and 1768.

By 1821, the parish had a population of 1,481.

The Cross Gates to Wetherby railway line opened in 1874, with a station in nearby Scholes, enabling residents to commute to Leeds city centre. This service remained running until 1965, when the line closed under the Beeching Axe.

Throughout the 20th century, the village grew with many modern houses being built in and around the village by both private developers and the local corporations. During this period many of the older cottages in the village centre were converted into shops and other small business premises.

For much of its history, the village supported a mainly agricultural community. From the late 17th century until the early 20th century many residents were employed in the local mining industry in Garforth, Cross Gates and Whitkirk. Today, whilst still having a rural agricultural feel, the village supports many trades as well as housing for people who work in Leeds and York.

Governance
Barwick-in-Elmet comes under the civil parish of Barwick and Scholes. This comes under the governance of Leeds City Council. Barwick is part of the Leeds City Council ward of Harewood. Barwick lies within the parliamentary constituency of Elmet and Rothwell which since May 2010 has been held by the Conservative MP, Alec Shelbrooke.

Maypole
The  maypole festival (held on Spring Bank Holiday) typically brings large crowds to the area. Every three years, the maypole is lowered, inspected, maintained and re-erected. The festival celebrations include a procession (involving floats decorated by local organisations), children's maypole dancing, morris dancing, a street craft market, the raising of the maypole ceremony and the maypole queen. Traditionally the maypole was lowered and raised manually using an intricate system of ropes and ladders. Although methods have changed in recent years, the maypole is still carried by hand from Hall Tower Hill to the heart of the village. During the raising ceremony, it is tradition for a local villager to climb halfway up the pole to disconnect the guide ropes. The climber is then spurred on by a large crowd to climb all the way to the top of the pole, to spin 'the fox' weather vane (a custom thought to bring good luck to the village). The festival takes place every 3 years, the most recent one being 29 May 2017. The date of the next rise was going to be 25 May 2020 but had to be postponed twice due to coronavirus and will now be taking place on 2 June 2022.

Beside the maypole is what appears to be an old village cross, which is actually a memorial to the dead of the First World War, carved in the old fashioned style.

Amenities

Barwick has three public houses, the New Inn, the Black Swan and the Gascoigne Arms. There are two general stores (the larger one with a post office); a fish and chip shop; an Italian takeaway; a bicycle store; a florist's, baker's, hair and beauty salon and a car mechanics. There are further amenities in nearby Garforth, Cross Gates, Seacroft and Wetherby, all of which have supermarkets. There are nearby secondary schools in Pendas Fields, Garforth, Seacroft, Boston Spa and Wetherby.

Places of worship

There are two small churches, one Church of England and one Methodist. Barwick parish church is a grade II* listed building. It includes Anglo-Saxon and Norman stonework, with a 14th-century chancel and various later additions and alterations. The Unitarian minister Newcome Cappe was married here on 19 February 1788 on his second marriage to Catherine Cappe.

The Methodist church is a 1900 Wesleyan chapel close to the maypole and a street called the Boyle. It replaced an earlier 1804 building on Chapel Lane, which became the Miners' Welfare Institute, and is now used for communal activities.

Local media
The local newspaper is the Wetherby News whilst the regional newspaper is the Yorkshire Evening Post. The local BBC radio station is BBC Radio Leeds, whilst there are many other independent local radio stations in the area. There are cinemas nearby in Leeds, Wetherby and Castleford.

Barwick in popular culture
The theme tune to The Archers is called "Barwick Green". It was written by Yorkshire composer Arthur Wood in 1924, as a "maypole dance" in his suite My Native Heath. The other items in this suite are "Ilkley Tarn", "Bolton Abbey" and "Knaresborough Status".

Widge, the protagonist in The Shakespeare Stealer, a 1998 young adult novel by Gary Blackwood, is from Barwick-in-Elmet.

Other Barwicks
There are other villages in England called Barwick in Norfolk and Somerset, and a suburb of Stockton-on-Tees is called Ingleby Barwick. There is a town called Barwick in Georgia in the USA.

Comparison

Barwick lies in the LS15 postcode area. Here is a population breakdown of the postcode area in comparison with the UK population.

Location grid

See also
Listed buildings in Barwick in Elmet and Scholes

References

Further reading

External links

 Leeds City Council
 Barwick-in-Elmet and Scholes Parish Council
 Barwick-in-Elmet Historical Society
 
 Barwick-in-Elmet Maypole Trust
 
 

 
Villages in West Yorkshire
Places in Leeds